Front and Center is an American television series that aired on public television in 2012, presented by PBS member station WLIW.  The series was originally called Front Row Center and was developed by the producers of Soundstage. The show features Grammy Award winners, Rock and Roll Hall of Fame Inductees, chart topping artists, and emerging artists.  Front and Center profiles some of the music world's better known artists and combines behind the scenes interviews with intimate performances.

CMA Songwriter Series
In 2014, Front and Center joined with the Country Music Association (CMA) to present two separate hour-long concert specials, featuring Nashville country artists.  The first episode featured Lady Antebellum and the second was a 10th Anniversary CMA Songwriters Series celebration and featured Dierks Bentley, joined by songwriters Jim Beavers, Ross Copperman, Brett James and Jon Randall. The idea came to fruition when Don Maggi, executive producer of Front and Center, paid a visit to one of the Songwriter Sessions in New York City at Joe's Pub, featuring Kix Brooks of Brooks & Dunn alongside several songwriters. "Hearing the passion and the stories that surround [the songs] was something that captured us and, for lack of a better word, was so real," Maggi told Rolling Stone Country, "That's something that we always try to capture on Front and Center."

List of episodes

References

2012 American television series debuts
American public access television shows
2010s American music television series